The Jedwabne pogrom was a massacre of Polish Jews in the town of Jedwabne, German-occupied Poland, on 10 July 1941, during World War II and the early stages of the Holocaust. Estimates of the number of victims vary from 300 to 1,600, including women, elderly and children, many of whom were locked in a barn and burnt alive. At least 40 ethnic Poles carried out the killing; their ringleaders decided on it beforehand with Germany's Gestapo, SS security police or SS intelligence and they then cooperated with German military police. According to historian Jan T. Gross, "the undisputed bosses of life and death in Jedwabne were the Germans," who were "the only ones who could decide the fate of the Jews."

Knowledge of the massacre only became widespread in 1999–2003 due to the work of Polish filmmakers, journalists, and academics, in particular Gross's 2001 work Neighbors: The Destruction of the Jewish Community in Jedwabne, Poland. Public interest in the incident prompted a forensic murder investigation in 2000–2003 by Poland's Institute of National Remembrance, which confirmed that the direct perpetrators were ethnic Poles. The country was shocked by the findings, which challenged common narratives about the Holocaust in Poland that focused on Polish suffering and heroism, and that non-Jewish Poles had little responsibility for the fate of Poland's Jews.

In a 2001 memorial ceremony at Jedwabne, President Aleksander Kwaśniewski apologized on behalf of the country, an apology which was repeated in 2011 by President Bronisław Komorowski. With the Law and Justice (PIS) party's rise to political power in 2015, the subject again became contentious, as part of the PIS's controversial "history policy"; President Andrzej Duda publicly criticized Komorowski's apology.

Background

Jedwabne

The Jewish community in Jedwabne was established in the 17th or 18th century. In 1937, 60 percent of the population were ethnic Poles and 40 percent Jewish. In 1939 the total population was around 2,720 to 2,800. (At the time about 10 percent of the population of Poland—35 million—was Jewish; it was the largest Jewish population in the world.)

Many in the region supported the National Party branch of the National Democracy movement, a right-wing and antisemitic bloc which sought to counter what it claimed was Jewish economic competition against Catholics and opposed the Polish socialist government of Józef Piłsudski and his successors. Prewar Polish-Jewish relations in the town were relatively good before 1939. At their most tense, when a Jewish woman was killed in Jedwabne and a Polish peasant in another town was killed a few days later, a rumor began that the Jedwabne Jews had taken revenge. The Jews anticipated a pogrom, but the local priest and rabbi stepped in, addressing the matter together.

According to Anna Bikont, residents of Jedwabne knew of the 1933 Radziłów pogrom that took place in nearby Radziłów, which was organized by National Democracy's far-right Camp of Great Poland (OWP) faction. The organization referred to the violence as a "revolution" against the Polish state, which it saw as a protector of Jews. One Jew was killed by the pogromists, and four pogromists were killed by the Polish police; the OWP was then banned by Poland's government for anti-state and racist activities.  Archival documents show Poland's government at this time was hostile to the Polish nationalist movement, because of the latter's attacks on Jews as well as its opposition to the Polish state; the government felt responsible for Jews and tried to protect them – arresting violent nationalists – and perceived Jews as trying to show loyalty to the Polish state.

World War II

World War II in Europe began on 1 September 1939 with the invasion of Poland by Nazi Germany. Later that month, the Soviet Red Army invaded the eastern regions of Poland under the Molotov–Ribbentrop Pact. The Germans transferred the area around Jedwabne to the Soviets in accordance with the German–Soviet Boundary Treaty of 28 September 1939. Anna M. Cienciala writes that most of the Jews understandably welcomed the Soviets as the "lesser evil than the Germans", though the Orthodox Jewish majority rejected their ideology, and businesspersons and the assimilated Jewish intelligentsia did not trust their intentions; and soon enough the Soviets had moved against the Jewish intelligentsia, arrested leaders of the Jewish Bund, and nationalized private businesses. According to NKVD (Soviet secret police) documents about Jedwabne and the surrounding area, "few Jews were involved as agents and informers, fewer in fact than Poles", she writes. Some younger Jews did accept roles within the lower ranks of Soviet administration and militia, for "they believed in the Communist slogans of equality and social justice, while also welcoming the chance to become upwardly mobile." Nevertheless, what stuck in Poles' minds was "the image of Jews welcoming the Soviets", and the collaboration of some communist Jews with the NKVD.

Anna Bikont writes that, under Soviet occupation, the Poles and Jews of Jedwabne had differing experiences of the local militia, which provided the authorities with names of anti-communist and antisemitic National Party members: "Polish accounts repeated that [the militia was] made up of Jews. The Jews themselves talk about Jews who made themselves of service to the Soviets in this first period, but they emphasize that [those Jews] were the exception rather than the rule." Regardless of the extent of the collaboration, it "strengthened the widely held stereotype of Judaeo-communism which had been promoted by right-wing parties before the war", write Jerzy Lukowski and Hubert Zawadzki. Krzysztof Persak writes that the antisemitic stereotype of Jewish Communism used by the National Party before the war conditioned the view of Jews as Soviet collaborators; the Soviet departure then triggered revenge: "Even though the Germans were in control of the situation in Jedwabne, there is no doubt that it was not hard to find dozens of willing participants of genocidal murder among the local Poles. Apart from the motive of robbery, psychological and political factors played a role as well. The massacres in Jedwabne and Radziłów and the bloody anti-Jewish incidents in some thirty other localities in the region took place at a special time and place... After two years of cruel occupation, the local Poles greeted the Wehrmacht as liberators. They also felt a strong revenge reflex toward Soviet collaborators, with Jews viewed as such en bloc. The attitude to the latter was conditioned by anti-Semitism, which was widespread in the area... As a result of a combination of all those factors, German inspiration and encouragement in Jedwabne met with favorable conditions."

Following Germany's invasion of the Soviet Union on 22 June 1941, German forces again overran Jedwabne and other parts of Poland that had been occupied by the Soviets. Christopher Browning writes: "Criminal orders from above and violent impulses from below created a climate of unmitigated violence.

Spate of pogroms

Shortly after the German invasion of Soviet-held Polish territory in late June 1941, Heinrich Himmler, the most powerful Nazi after Adolf Hitler, complained that pogroms had not broken out in the newly conquered Polish region where Jedwabne is located. 

The complaint was responded to by Himmler's subordinate, Reinhard Heydrich, chief of the Reich Main Security Office commanding the German Security Police, or Sicherheitspolizei, which in turn controlled Germany's SS paramilitary death squads, or Einsatzgruppen. Heydrich issued orders on 29 June and 2 July 1941 applying to newly-captured Polish territory previously controlled by the Soviets. These were for German forces to support "self-cleansing actions" by local anti-Semitic activists and anti-communists against people alleged to have collaborated with the Soviet occupation — Polish communists and Jews. Instigation of massacres in the newly-conquered region were a part of the German extermination operation, and documents show a pattern of similarity between them.

Heydrich ordered: "No obstacles should be made for the efforts aimed at self-cleaning among anti-communist and anti-Jewish circles in the newly occupied territories. To the contrary, they should be instigated without leaving a trace, and if need be—intensified and directed on the right track, but in such a manner so that the local ‘self-defense circles’ could not refer to the orders or political promises made to them."

Holocaust historian Peter Longerich wrote in 2007: "Even if the murders were carried out by local people - or more precisely by a group of forty or so men, distinct from other members of the indigenous population, mostly not from the town itself but from the surrounding area - closer analysis of the crime has now demonstrated that the pogrom was engineered by a unit of the German Security Police. This was probably a commando from the Gestapo office in Zichenau that had been assigned to Einsatzgruppe B as an auxiliary troop and which had organized several pogroms in the western part of the Voivodeship of Bialystok (in which Jedwabne was located); it had recruited local Poles as auxiliary 'pogrom police' for this purpose."

After the German occupation, Polish villagers participated in pogroms against Jews in 23 localities of the Łomża and Białystok areas of the Podlasie region, with varying degrees of German involvement. Generally smaller attacks took place at Bielsk Podlaski (the village of Pilki), Choroszcz, Czyżew, Goniądz, Grajewo, Jasionówka, Kleszczele, Knyszyn, Kolno, Kuźnica, Narewka, Piątnica, Radziłów, Rajgród, Sokoły, Stawiski, Suchowola, Szczuczyn, Trzcianne, Tykocin, Wasilków, Wąsosz, and Wizna. On 5 July 1941, during the Wąsosz pogrom, Polish residents knifed and beat to death about 150–250 Jews. Two days later, during the Radziłów pogrom, local Poles are reported to have murdered 800 Jews, 500 of whom were burned in a barn. The murders took place after the Gestapo had arrived in the towns. 

Writing in 2011, historians Bert Hoppe and Hiltrud Glass observed that in all massacres in German-occupied territories, there are indications of the leading role of German units even where non-Germans were the murderers, such as in Jedwabne. 

In the days before the Jedwabne massacre, the town's Jewish population increased as refugees arrived from nearby Radziłów and Wizna. In Wizna, the town's Polish "civil head" (wójt) had ordered the Jewish community's expulsion; 230–240 Jews fled to Jedwabne.

According to various accounts, Persak writes, the Germans had set up a Feldgendarmerie in Jedwabne, staffed by eight or eleven military police. The police reportedly set up a "collaborationist civilian town council" led by a former mayor, Marian Karolak. Karolak established a local police force, whose members included Eugeniusz Kalinowski and Jerzy Laudanski. The town council is reported to have included Eugeniusz Sliwecki, Józef Sobutka, and Józef Wasilewski. Karol Bardon, a translator for the Germans, may also have been a member.

Persak writes that the area around Łomża and western Białystok was one of the few Polish-majority areas that had, since 1939, been experiencing the cruelty of Soviet occupation. Thus, when the Germans arrived in 1941, the population saw them as liberators; together with historical antisemitism, this created conditions ripe for German incitement.

Jedwabne pogrom (1941)

10 July 1941

There is general agreement that German secret police or intelligence officials were seen in Jedwabne on the morning of 10 July 1941, or the day before, and met with the town council. Szmuel Wasersztajn's witness statement in 1945 said that eight Gestapo men arrived on 10 July and met with the town authorities. Another witness said four or five Gestapo men arrived and "they began to talk in the town hall". "Gestapo man" was used to refer to any German in a black uniform, Persak writes. The witnesses said they believed the meeting had been held to discuss murdering the town's Jews.

According to the IPN's report, on 10 July 1941 Polish men from nearby villages began arriving in Jedwabne "with the intention of participating in the premeditated murder of the Jewish inhabitants of the town". Gross writes that a leading role in the pogrom was carried out by four men, including Jerzy Laudański and Karol Bardoń, who had earlier collaborated with the Soviet NKVD and were now trying to recast themselves as zealous collaborators with the Germans. He also writes that no "sustained organized activity" could have taken place in the town without the Germans' consent.

The town's Jews were forced out of their homes and taken to the market square, where they were ordered to weed the area by pulling up grass from between the cobblestones. While doing this, they were beaten and made to dance or perform exercises by residents from Jedwabne and nearby. 

Evoking the antisemitic stereotype of "Żydokomuna" against their victims, who they alleged had collaborated with the Soviet regime, 40–50 Jewish men were forced to demolish a statue of Lenin in a nearby square and carry part of the statue on a wooden stretcher to the market square then to a nearby barn, while singing communist songs. The local rabbi, Awigdor Białostocki, and the kosher butcher, Mendel Nornberg, led the procession. According to an eyewitness, Szmuel Wasersztajn, the group was taken to the barn, where they were made to dig a pit and throw the statue in. They were then killed and buried in the same pit. Polish government investigators found this grave during a partial exhumation in 2001. It held the remains of about 40 men, a kosher butcher's knife, and the head of the concrete Lenin statue.

Most of Jedwabne's remaining Jews, around 300 men, women, children and infants, were then locked inside the barn, which was set on fire, probably using kerosene from former Soviet supplies. This group was buried in the barn near the first group. The 2001 exhumation found a mass grave within the barn's foundations and another close to the foundations.

Several witnesses reported seeing German photographers take pictures of the massacre. There was also speculation that the pogrom was filmed.

Survivors

The IPN found that some Jews had been alerted by non-Jewish acquaintances the evening before that "a collective action was being prepared against the Jews". Between 100 and 125 Jews who escaped the pogrom lived in an open ghetto in Jedwabne before being transferred to the Łomża ghetto in November 1942. Several escaped to other towns. In November 1942, when the Germans began putting ghetto inmates on trains to the Auschwitz concentration camp for extermination, seven of them—Moshe Olszewicz, his wife, Lea, and his brother, Dov; Lea and Jacob Kubran; Józef Grądowski; and Szmuel Wasersztajn—escaped again to the nearby hamlet of Janczewko. There they were hidden by Antonina Wyrzykowska and Aleksander Wyrzykowski, on the couple's farm, from November 1942 to January 1945. Despite a very "aggressive attitude from Polish neighbours" and inspections by German personnel, the Wyrzykowskis managed to hide the group until the Red Army liberated Janczewko from the German occupiers in January 1945. Shortly after, the Wyrzykowskis were beaten by a group of Polish nationalists for having helped Jews; the couple had to leave the area and eventually moved to Milanówek, near Warsaw.

Early criminal investigations, 1949–1965

1949–1950 trials

After the war, in 1949 and 1950, 22 suspects from the town and vicinity were put on trial in Poland, accused of collaborating with the Germans during the pogrom. None of the defendants had a higher education and three were illiterate. Twelve were convicted of treason against Poland and one was condemned to death. Some of the men confessed after being tortured during interviews with the Security Office (UB). The confessions were retracted in court and the accused were released. Those who retracted included Józef Chrzanowski, Marian Żyluk, Czesław Laudański, Wincenty Gościcki, Roman and Jan Zawadzki, Aleksander and Franciszek Łojewski, Eugeniusz Śliwecki, and Stanisław Sielawa.

German investigation, 1960–1965
SS-Hauptsturmführer Wolfgang Birkner was investigated by prosecutors in West Germany in 1960 on suspicion of involvement in the massacres of Jews in Jedwabne, Radziłów, and Wąsosz in 1941. The charges were based on research by Szymon Datner, head of the Białystok branch of the Central Committee of Polish Jews (CŻKH). The German prosecutors found no hard evidence implicating Birkner, but in the course of their investigation they discovered a new German witness, the former SS Kreiskommissar of Łomża, who named the paramilitary Einsatzgruppe B under SS-Obersturmführer Hermann Schaper as having been deployed in the area at the time of the pogroms. The methods used by Schaper's death squad in the Radziłów massacre were identical to those employed in Jedwabne only three days later. During the German investigation at Ludwigsburg in 1964, Schaper lied to interrogators, claiming that in 1941 he had been a truck driver. Legal proceedings against the accused were terminated on 2 September 1965.

Aftermath
In 1963 a monument to the victims was placed in Jedwabne by the Polish communist state's Society of Fighters for Freedom and Democracy. Its inscription blamed the Germans: "The place of destruction of the Jewish population. Here Gestapo and Nazi gendarmes burned alive 1600 people on 10 July 1941."

According to Ewa Wolentarska-Ochman, "although almost absent from Poland's official historical record, the massacre remained very much alive in local oral tradition and among Jewish survivors from the region."

Jan T. Gross's Neighbors, 2000

Jan T. Gross's book Sąsiedzi: Historia zagłady żydowskiego miasteczka ("Neighbors: The Story of the Annihilation of a Jewish Town") caused a "moral earthquake" when it was published in Poland in May 2000, according to Piotr Wróbel. It appeared in English, German and Hebrew within the year. In English it was published in April 2001 by Princeton University Press as Neighbors: The Destruction of the Jewish Community in Jedwabne, Poland.

Writing that "one day, in July 1941, half of the population of a small East European town murdered the other half—some 1,600 men, women and children", Gross concluded that the Jedwabne Jews had been rounded up and killed by a mob of their own Polish neighbors. This ran contrary to Poland's official account that they had been killed by Germans. Political scientist Michael Shafir writes that the pogrom had been "subjected to confinement in the Communist 'black hole of history'". While Gross recognized that no "sustained organizing activity" could have taken place without the Germans' consent, he concluded that the massacre had been carried out entirely by Poles from Jedwabne and the surrounding area, and that the Germans had not coerced them.

Gross's sources were Szmuel Wasersztajn's 1945 witness statement from the Jewish Historical Institute; witness statements and other trial records from the 1949–1950 trials; the Yedwabne: History and Memorial Book (1980), written by Jedwabne residents who had moved to the United States; and interviews from the 1990s conducted by Gross and a filmmaker. While several Polish historians praised Gross for having drawn attention to the pogrom, others criticized him for relying too heavily on witness accounts, which they argued were not reliable, and—where conflicting accounts existed—for choosing those that showed the Poles in the worst possible light. He was also criticized for having failed to examine the pogrom within the context of German actions during the early stages of the Holocaust. According to Dan Stone, "some historians sought to dispute the fundamentals of Gross's findings by massive attention to minute details, burying the wider picture under a pile of supposed inaccuracies".

According to Ewa Wolentarska-Ochman, the publication of Neighbors "[left] young generations... unable to comprehend how such a crime could be generally unknown and never spoken about in the last 50 years."

Polish government investigation, 2000–2003

Exhumation
In July 2000, following the publication of Gross's book, the Polish parliament ordered a new investigation to be conducted by the Institute of National Remembrance –Commission for the Prosecution of Crimes against the Polish Nation (Instytut Pamięci Narodowej –Komisja Ścigania Zbrodni przeciwko Narodowi Polskiemu, or IPN).

In May–June 2001 the IPN conducted an exhumation at the site of the barn. Charred bodies were found in two mass graves, and broken pieces of the bust of Lenin. According to Dariusz Stola, "experts agree that there are no more than 400–450 bodies. This figure is compatible with the size of the barn that constituted the killing site (19 × 7 meters, or 62 × 23 feet)." The exhumation lasted just five days because of religious objections from Orthodox Jews; in Digging for the Disappeared (2015), Adam Rosenblatt writes that, because of this, what happened in Jedwabne "is likely to remain forever murky". According to William Haglund, a forensic expert for Physicians for Human Rights, who attended the exhumation as an international observer, the process should have lasted several months. In his view, the number of bodies could not be estimated in the short space of time.

The Polish government had to compromise and agree that only the top layer and small fragments would be examined; large pieces of bone would not be moved. The exhumation reportedly ended, according to Haglund, "with some of the non-Jewish Polish investigators weeping in frustration as they watched one of the rabbis lowering the charred teeth and bone fragments ... back into the graves".

Interviews
Over the course of two years, IPN investigators interviewed some 111 witnesses, mainly from Poland, but also from Israel and the United States. One-third of the IPN witnesses had been eyewitnesses of some part of the pogrom; most had been children at the time. The IPN also searched for documents in Polish archives in Warsaw, Białystok and Łomża, in German archives, and at Yad Vashem in Israel. During a visit to New York in January 2001, Leon Kieres, President of the IPN, said the IPN had found enough evidence to confirm that a group of Poles had been the perpetrators. In June 2001, the IPN said ammunition shells recovered from the site were German, prompting speculation that German soldiers had fired at Jews fleeing the barn, but the IPN later found that the shells were from a different historical period.

Findings

On 9 July 2002 the IPN issued a press release on the findings of its two-year investigation, signed by the chief prosecutor, Radosław J. Ignatiew. The IPN found that at least 340 Jews had been killed in the pogrom, in two groups. The first group consisted of 40 to 50 men, who were murdered before the barn was set on fire. The second group consisted of about 300 people of "both sexes of various ages, including children and infants". The second group was "led into a wooden, thatched barn owned by Bronisław Śleszyński. After the building had been closed, it was doused, probably with kerosene from the former Soviet warehouse." The exact number of victims could not be determined. The previously estimated figure of 1,600 "seems highly unlikely, and was not confirmed in the course of the investigation".

The report concluded that the perpetrators of the crime sensu stricto ("in the strict sense") were at least 40 male "Polish inhabitants of Jedwabne and its environs". Responsibility for the crime sensu largo ("in the broad sense") could be ascribed to the Germans because of the presence of German military policemen at the Jedwabne police station. Their presence, "though passive, was tantamount to consent to and tolerance of the crime against the Jewish inhabitants of the town".

Several witnesses had testified that uniformed Germans had arrived in the town that day and drove the group of Jews to the market place. IPN could neither conclusively prove nor disprove these accounts. "Witness testimonies vary considerably" on the question of whether the Germans took the Jews to the barn or were present there. The IPN found that the "Polish population" had played a "decisive role in the execution of the criminal plan". The IPN wrote: "On the basis of the evidence gathered in the investigation, it is not possible to determine the reasons for the passive behavior of the majority of the town's population in the face of the crime. In particular, it cannot be determined whether this passivity resulted from acceptance of the crime or from intimidation caused by the brutality of the perpetrators' acts."

Leon Kieres delivered the IPN report to the Polish parliament. A small opposition party, the League of Polish Families (LPR) called him a "servant of the Jews" and blamed him and President Aleksander Kwaśniewski for "stoning the Polish nation". LPR MP Antoni Macierewicz made an official complaint against the IPN's conclusion that ethnic Poles and not the Germans had committed the massacre. A 203-page expanded version of the findings was issued by the IPN on 30 June 2003; pages 60–160 contained summaries of the testimonies of witnesses interviewed by the IPN. The report was supplemented by two volumes of studies and documents, Wokół Jedwabnego (Vol. 1: Studies, 525 pages, and Vol. 2: Documents, 1,034 pages. On 30 June 2003 Ignatiew announced that the investigation of "the mass murder of at least 340 Polish citizens of Jewish nationality in Jedwabne on July 10, 1941" had found no living suspects who had not already been brought to justice, and therefore the IPN investigation was closed.

2019 IPN statement
Jaroslaw Szarek, director of Poland's Institute of National Remembrance (IPN), said in February 2019 that the IPN was ready to re-open the investigation and exhume the remaining bodies, but the National Prosecutor's Office decided in March that there were no grounds for doing so.

Legacy

Recognizing the Wyrzykowskis

In January 1976 Antonina Wyrzykowska and Aleksander Wyrzykowski were recognized as Righteous Among the Nations medal by the Israeli Yad Vashem institution.

President's apology

In July 2001, on the 60th anniversary of the pogrom, Polish president Aleksander Kwaśniewski attended a ceremony at Jedwabne where he apologized for the massacre: "We can have no doubt that here in Jedwabne Polish citizens were killed at the hands of fellow citizens ... I apologise in my own name, and in the name of those Poles whose conscience is shattered by that crime." The ceremony was attended by Catholic and Jewish religious leaders and survivors of the pogrom. Most of the 2,000 locals of Jedwabne, including the town's priest, boycotted the ceremony in protest against the apology.

Shevah Weiss, Israeli Ambassador to Poland, also delivered a speech. "Living among us also are Holocaust survivors whose lives were saved as a result of the brave actions of their Polish neighbors," he said. He praised Poland's investigation. Former Polish president Lech Walesa said at the time: "The Jedwabne crime was a revenge for the cooperation of the Jewish community with the Soviet occupant. The Poles have already apologized many times to the Jews; we are waiting for the apology from the other side because many Jews were scoundrels."

New monument
The Jedwabne monument was replaced in July 2001 by a six-foot-tall stone with an inscription, in Hebrew, Polish, and Yiddish, that makes no mention of the perpetrators: "To the Memory of Jews from Jedwabne and the Surrounding Area, Men, Women, and Children, Co-inhabitants of this Land, Who Were Murdered and Burned Alive on This Spot on July 10, 1941." The memorial stone is surrounded by a series of stone blocks that mark the site of the barn. In August 2001 Jedwabne mayor Krzysztof Godlewski, a pioneer for the commemoration of the massacre, resigned in protest at the local council's refusal to fund a new road to the site. He received the Jan Karski Award in 2002, along with Rabbi Jacob Baker, author of Yedwabne: History and Memorial Book (1980).

Asking for forgiveness
On 11 July 2011 Poland's President Bronisław Komorowski asked for forgiveness at a ceremony marking the 70th anniversary. In September that year, the Jedwabne memorial was defaced with swastikas and graffiti. Poland launched an anti-hate crime investigation.

Influence on political discourse
In Poland's 2015 presidential election campaign debate, the future President Duda criticized his rival, the then President Bronisław Komorowski, for "failure to defend Poland's reputation" and apologizing for the massacre of Jews by Poles at the Jedwabne pogrom.

Writing on Poland's ruling party and its historical policy, Joanna Michlic explains that "according to the politicians, historians, and journalists representing PiS's ideological position, Jedwabne and other events that cast a negative light on Polish national identity must be revisited and retold for both Poles and the West. In their eyes, Jedwabne is a key sign of 'all the lies voiced against the Polish nation,' and is understood as the 'central attack' on Polishness, Polish values and traditions, and Polish identity (understood in an ethnic sense)."

Jörg Hackmann states that "three major explanations of the murders of Jedwabne prevail: First, that responsibility has to be seen within the Polish society... Second, [rejection of a] connection between the murders and a general Polish antisemitism [and insistence on] the image of the Pole being an "innocent and noble victim of foreign violence and intrigue" by Hitler and Stalin alike. And third, ... [a] the thesis of ascribing the responsibility solely to the Germans, which in 2016 was repeated by the current director of IPN, Jarosław Szarek..." Hackmann emphasizes the "symbolic meaning of Jedwabne for the Polish debate on World War II", quoting Joanna Michlic: "Jedwabne on the one hand, "has become the key symbol of the counter-memory of the old, hegemonic, biased narratives of the Holocaust"... On the other hand, Jedwabne has been regarded by the critics of Jan Gross as embodiment of "'all the lies voiced against the Polish nation,' and is understood as the 'central attack' on Polishness, Polish values and traditions, and Polish identity."" He summarizes that "in this context, Jedwabne has been repeatedly addressed as [a] core feature of a "pedagogy of disgrace" (pedagogika wstydu)."

Media

Polish film-maker Agnieszka Arnold made two documentary films interviewing witnesses of the massacre. Gdzie mój starszy syn Kain ("Where is my elder son Cain", 1999), includes interviews with Szmul Wasersztajn and the daughter of the owner of the barn where the massacre took place. The second, Sąsiedzi ("Neighbors", 2001), deals with the subject in greater depth. Gross's book of the same name was written with Arnold's permission to use the title. Gross appears in Haim Hecht's documentary Two Barns (2014), along other prominent Holocaust historians (Yehuda Bauer, Jan Grabowski, and Havi Dreifuss), as well as Wislawa Szymborska and Shevah Weiss.

Wokół Jedwabnego (2002)
Wokół Jedwabnego ("On Jedwabne") is an official two-volume Institute of National Remembrance (IPN) publication, edited by Paweł Machcewicz and Krzysztof Persak. Volume 1, Studies (525 pages) contains historical and legal research by IPN historians. Volume 2, Documents (1,034 pages), contains original documents collected by the IPN investigation.

The Neighbors Respond (2003)
An extensive collection of articles from the Polish and international debate, in English translation, was published in 2003 as The Neighbors Respond: The Controversy over the Jedwabne Massacre in Poland by Joanna Michlic and Antony Polonsky of Brandeis University. The book includes articles from Polish and other historians, the IPN's findings, and essays from Polish newspapers such as Rzeczpospolita and Gazeta Wyborcza. The collection features archival documents and essays covering the entire 1939–1941 period. Contributors include Anna Bikont, David Engel, Israel Gutman, Adam Michnik, Bogdan Musial, Dariusz Stola, and Tomasz Strzembosz.

The Massacre in Jedwabne, 10 July 1941 (2005)
Marek Jan Chodakiewicz's book The Massacre in Jedwabne, 10 July 1941: Before, During, and After challenges Gross's interpretation of events. It suggests that four or five truckloads of armed SS men from Łomża terrorized the local population before leading Jews and Poles to the crime scene. Chodakiewicz argues that all the primary sources are wrong or worthless, including the testimony of Szmul Wasersztajn, the investigation of the 22 suspects for the 1949 trial, and the partial exhumation of the bodies. "And yet," Piotr Wróbel wrote in The Sarmatian Review, "Chodakiewicz is able to present his recreation of the crime. It was well preplanned, initiated by the Germans, and utterly lacked any pogrom-like spontaneity." Chodakiewicz's good arguments, Wróbel wrote, are "overshadowed by numerous flaws", lack a sense of proportion, and make selective use of information from sources that support Chodakiewicz's view. According to Wróbel, the book has a "visible political agenda" and is "difficult to read, unoriginal, irritating, and unconvincing".

Reviewing the book for History, Peter D. Stachura agreed with Chodakiewicz that the pogrom had been executed by German police, "with only limited involvement from a very small number of Poles", including "Volksdeutsche (Polish citizens of German origin) and petty criminals". In response, Joanna Michlic and Antony Polonsky complained about the review to the editor of History. Chodakiewicz's and Stachura's conclusions were "very far from those reached by most historians", they wrote, including the IPN. Chodakiewicz and Stachura "uphold a view of the Polish past which seeks to return to an untenable vision of modern Poland as solely victim and hero ... It is a matter of considerable regret to us that you have allowed your journal to be used to advance this neo-nationalist agenda."

Our Class (2009)
A 2009 play, Our Class by Polish playwright Tadeusz Słobodzianek, dealing with a massacre of Jews by Poles in a small town during the Holocaust, was performed in London. The play follows the lives of 10 Catholic and Jewish Polish students from the same class at school, beginning in 1925.

See also

 Aftermath (2012 film)
 Anti-Jewish violence in Poland, 1944–1946
 Kaunas pogrom
 Kielce pogrom
 List of anti-Jewish pogroms in Poland during World War II
 Mieczysław Kosmowski
 Polish Righteous Among the Nations

Sources

Notes

Citations

Works cited

 

 
 
 
 
 
 
 
 
 
 
 
 
 
 
 -->

Further reading

 Darewicz, Krzysztof (10 March 2001). "We Trusted Each Other: Jedwabne Rabbi Jacob Baker". Trans. Peter K. Gessner. Rzeczpospolita.
 
 
 
 Grünberg, Slawomir (2005). The Legacy of Jedwabne. Spencer, New York: LogTV (documentary).

External links 
 

 
1941 in Poland
Controversies in Poland
Religious controversies in Poland
July 1941 events
Massacres in 1941
Poland in World War II
World War II crimes in Poland
1941 in Judaism
1941 murders in Poland